The 1917 South Dakota Coyotes football team represented the University of South Dakota during the 1917 college football season.

Schedule

References

South Dakota
South Dakota Coyotes football seasons
South Dakota Coyotes football